The 2018–19 Scottish League Two (known as Ladbrokes League Two for sponsorship reasons) was the 24th season in the current format of 10 teams in the fourth-tier of Scottish football. The fixtures were published on 15 June 2018 and the season began on 4 August 2018.

The bottom team entered a two-legged play-off against the winners of the Pyramid play-off between the Highland League and Lowland League champions, to determine which team competes in League Two in the 2019–20 season.

Ten teams contested the league: Albion Rovers, Annan Athletic, Berwick Rangers, Clyde, Cowdenbeath, Edinburgh City, Elgin City, Peterhead, Queen's Park and Stirling Albion.

Peterhead lifted the title after a 2–0 win at Queen's Park on the final day.

Teams
The following teams changed division after the 2017–18 season.

To League Two
Relegated from Scottish League One
 Queen's Park
 Albion Rovers

From League Two
Promoted to Scottish League One
 Montrose
 Stenhousemuir

Stadia and locations

Personnel and kits

Managerial changes

League summary

League table

Positions by round
The table lists the positions of teams after each week of matches. In order to preserve chronological progress, any postponed matches are not included in the round at which they were originally scheduled, but added to the full round they were played immediately afterwards. For example, if a match is scheduled for matchday 13, but then postponed and played between days 16 and 17, it will be added to the standings for day 16.

Source: Scottish League Two - Table 
Updated: 4 May 2019

Results
Teams play each other four times, twice in the first half of the season (home and away) and twice in the second half of the season (home and away), making a total of 180 games, with each team playing 36.

First half of season

Second half of season

Season statistics

Scoring

Top scorers

Hat-tricks 

Note

(H) = Home, (A) = Away;

Attendances

Awards

Monthly awards

League Two play-offs
The Pyramid play-off was contested between the champions of the 2018–19 Highland Football League (Cove Rangers) and the 2018–19 Lowland Football League (East Kilbride). Cove were victorious 5–1 on aggregate and faced the bottom club (Berwick Rangers) in the League Two play-off final, being promoted to League Two for the 2019–20 season after a 7–0 aggregate win. As Berwick Rangers lost the play-off, they were relegated to the Lowland League since they were south of 56.4513N latitude (middle of the Tay Road Bridge).

Pyramid play-off

First leg

Second leg

Final

First leg

Second leg

References

Scottish League Two seasons
4
4
Scot